The 2019 William & Mary Tribe football team represented the College of William & Mary as a member of the Colonial Athletic Association (CAA) in the 2019 NCAA Division I FCS football season. The Tribe, led by first-year head coach Mike London, played their home games at Zable Stadium. They finished the season 5–7 overall and 3–5 in CAA play to tie for ninth place.

Previous season
The Tribe finished the 2018 season 4–6, 3–4 in CAA play to finish in eighth place.

On August 5, 2018, Laycock announced that he would be retiring after the conclusion of the 2018 season. He finished at William & Mary with a 39-year record of 249–194–2.

Preseason

CAA poll
In the CAA preseason poll released on July 23, 2019, the Tribe were predicted to finish in eleventh place.

Preseason All–CAA team
The Tribe had two players selected to the preseason all-CAA team.

Offense

Tyler Crist – FB

Defense

Isaiah Laster – S

Schedule

Game summaries

Lafayette

at Virginia

Colgate

at East Carolina

at Albany

Villanova

James Madison

Maine

at Elon

The five-overtime match-up against Elon marked the longest game in school history (the Tribe had never played in a game longer than two overtimes). This contest was also the first time a new NCAA football overtime rule was used (effected in 2019): starting with the fifth overtime period, each team will line up to attempt a two-point conversion instead of snapping the ball from the 25-yard-line. William & Mary converted their attempt while Elon did not.

Rhode Island

Towson

at Richmond

References

William and Mary Tribe
William & Mary Tribe football seasons
William and Mary Tribe football